Vine Cynthia Colby (1852–1878) was one of the pioneering women in medicine.

Early life
The women in the Colby family had a higher education uncommon for the time, mainly due to the effort and support of Colby's grandmother, Celestia Rice Colby (1827–1900). Celestia Rice Colby's diaries were published in 2006: Circumstances are Destiny: An Antebellum Woman's Struggle to Define Sphere edited by Tina Stewart Brakebill. Her daughter was Vine Cynthia Colby (1852–1878). Vine Cynthia Colby bears the name of her mother's best friends, Vine and Cynthia, both of whom died young.

In June 1870, Vine Cynthia Colby graduated from high school in Freeport and soon afterwards she moved with her family to Ann Arbor, Michigan, where she enrolled at University of Michigan.

Personal life
On December 19, 1873, Vine Cynthia Colby married a fellow student at University of Michigan, Sidney Foster. Sidney Foster graduated in 1874, Vine Cynthia Colby graduated with a B.Ph. from the College of Literature, Science and the Arts in 1876.

Career
In 1877 the Fosters moved to Keokuk, Iowa, where they both graduated from medical school. After graduation, the Fosters moved to Moira, New York, where they opened a joint practice.

Death
Vine Colby Forster died at only 25 years old, in March 1878 from pelvic peritonitis and is buried at Moira Community Cemetery, Moira.

Legacy
Dr. June Rose Colby, Vine Cynthia Colby's sister, graduated with an A.B. from Literary Class of State Normal School in 1878, and who received graduate degrees in 1885, A.M., and 1886, Ph.D. When she died in 1936 she left $500 ($7,788.13 in 2017) to University of Michigan League, Ann Arbor, to purchase German and French books for the Rest Room of the League Building in memory of her sister Vine Colby Foster and directed that her sister's name was inscribed in each book purchased from this fund.

Vine Colby one of the member of The Potters (artists group), and her niece was named after Vine Cynthia Colby Foster.

References

1852 births
1878 deaths
American women physicians
University of Michigan College of Literature, Science, and the Arts alumni
19th-century women physicians
19th-century American physicians